Pieter Bulling (born 2 March 1993) is a New Zealand professional racing cyclist. He rode at the 2015 UCI Track Cycling World Championships, winning gold in the team pursuit. Of Māori descent, Bulling affiliates to the Ngāi Tahu iwi. Alongside Aaron Gate, Regan Gough, and Dylan Kennett, he came fourth in the men's team pursuit at the 2016 Rio Olympics, being beaten by Denmark to the bronze medal.

References

External links

1993 births
Living people
New Zealand male cyclists
Cyclists from Invercargill
Cyclists at the 2016 Summer Olympics
Olympic cyclists of New Zealand
Ngāi Tahu people
New Zealand Māori sportspeople
Commonwealth Games medallists in cycling
Commonwealth Games bronze medallists for New Zealand
New Zealand track cyclists
Cyclists at the 2014 Commonwealth Games
21st-century New Zealand people
Medallists at the 2014 Commonwealth Games